Mehmet Şükrü Erdinç (born 4 January 1976) is a Turkish politician from the Justice and Development Party (AKP), who has served as a Member of Parliament for Adana since 12 June 2011.

Born in Adıyaman, Erdinç graduated from Adana Imam Hatip school and went on to train as a lawyer. He became active in the AKP first as a youth member, working in the party's Çukurova district branch and participating in the party's campaign in every election that it contested. He was elected as an AKP Member of Parliament in the 2011 general election and was re-elected in June 2015.

See also
25th Parliament of Turkey

References

External links
 Grand National Assembly MP profile
 Collection of all relevant news items at Haberler.com
 Collection of all relevant news items at Son Dakika

Justice and Development Party (Turkey) politicians
Deputies of Adana
Members of the 25th Parliament of Turkey
Living people
People from Adıyaman
1976 births
Members of the 24th Parliament of Turkey
Members of the 26th Parliament of Turkey